Rancho Ex-Mission San Fernando was a  Mexican land grant in present-day Los Angeles County, California, granted in 1846 by Governor Pío Pico to Eulogio F. de Celis. The grant derives its name from the secularized Mission San Fernando Rey de España, but was called ex-Mission because of a division made of the lands held in the name of the mission—the church retaining the grounds immediately around, and all of the lands outside of this were called ex-Mission lands. The grant encompassed most of the present-day San Fernando Valley.

History
Eulogio de Celis, a native of Spain, had settled in California in 1836.  De Celis operated a hide trading business with Henry D. Fitch, Jonathan Temple and Abel Stearns. He married Josefa Argüello, daughter of Governor Luís Antonio Argüello. In 1846, to raise war funds during the Mexican–American War, the Pico government sold the secularized lands from the Mission San Fernando to Eulogio de Celis.

With the cession of California to the United States following the Mexican–American War, the 1848 Treaty of Guadalupe Hidalgo provided that the land grants would be honored. As required by the Land Act of 1851, a claim was filed with the United States Public Land Commission in 1852 and the land grant was patented to Eulogio de Celis in 1873. De Celis, with his wife and family, went back to Spain in 1854, where he died in 1869.

The grant, which was supposed to contain fourteen square leagues, was bounded on the north by Rancho San Francisco and the Santa Susana Mountains, on the west by the Simi Hills, on the east by Rancho Tujunga, and on the south by the Montañas de Portesuelo (Santa Monica Mountains). When the Rancho Ex-Mission San Fernando grant was patented in 1873, it was surveyed at nearly twenty six square leagues, the single largest land grant in California.

Before the De Celis grant, Andrés Pico, brother of Governor Pío Pico, had leased the Rancho Ex-Mission San Fernando in 1845. In 1853, Andrés Pico acquired an undivided half interest, and Rancho Ex-Mission San Fernando was split in half, along present-day Roscoe Boulevard, between Andrés Pico (who had the southern half of the ranch to the Santa Monica Mountains) and Eulogio de Celis (who had the northern half of the ranch to the Santa Susana Mountains).

In debt, Andrés Pico had sold his southern half-interest in the Rancho ex-Mission San Fernando to his brother Pío Pico in 1862.  Pio Pico sold his half share of the Ex-San Fernando Mission land to Isaac Lankershim (operating as the "San Fernando Farm Homestead Association") in 1869.  In 1873, Isaac Lankershim's son, James Boon Lankershim, and future son-in-law, Isaac Newton Van Nuys, moved to the San Fernando Valley and took over management of the property.  During the 1880s, the San Fernando Farm Homestead Association was succeeded by the "Los Angeles Farm & Milling Company".

After De Celis died in 1869, his son, Eulogio F. de Celis, returned from Spain to Los Angeles. In 1874, the heirs of Eulogio de Celis sold their northern half of Rancho Ex-Mission San Fernando to northern Californians, California State Senator Charles Maclay and his partners George K. Porter, a San Francisco shoe manufacturer, and his cousin Benjamin F. Porter. The Porters land was west of present-day Sepulveda Boulevard, and the Maclay land was east of Sepulveda Boulevard.

See also
 History of the San Fernando Valley to 1915
 List of Los Angeles Historic-Cultural Monuments in the San Fernando Valley
 Rómulo Pico Adobe
 Ranchos of California

References

Ex-Mission San Fernando
Ex-Mission San Fernando
History of the San Fernando Valley
History of Los Angeles
Spanish missions in California
Canoga Park, Los Angeles
Mission Hills, Los Angeles
Northridge, Los Angeles
Panorama City, Los Angeles
Reseda, Los Angeles
San Fernando, California
Sherman Oaks, Los Angeles
Tarzana, Los Angeles
Van Nuys, Los Angeles
Woodland Hills, Los Angeles
Ex-Mission
19th century in Los Angeles